F.C. Spartak Varna was a semi-professional Bulgarian football club based in Topoli. The club has no home ground and uses the playground in Topoli near Varna. The club was formed in 2010 by Spartak Varna supporters following Injstroi Holding's controversial takeover which led to most of its supporters defecting from the club. They are affectionately referred to as "The Falcons". The history of the team is identic like F.C. United of Manchester. In the early 2011 the team was dissolved.

Fans 
On 24 March 2000 was founded the official 'Fan Club Falcons', which has the goal to unite and organize the supporters of Spartak, and the different fan-formations of the Falcons in Varna. The fan-club was founded later, but finally, it was decided to create an official organization, which would coordinate the actions, make contacts with the governing body of the Football Club, official meetings with the police authorities, etc. However, this organization is a successor of the long years of appearance of the fanatics of Spartak Varna and their devoted love and support for the beloved team. Fan groups from Spartak Varna have Left Wing political views.

Fan groups:
 Spartak Varna Ultra Division
 Mladost boys'95
 Vladislavovo boys'96
 Spartak youth
 Brigade hools

Motto:
 ALWAYS LOYAL TO SPARTAK / SEMPER FIDELES!

Last squad 
As of September 25, 2010

External links 
 Official website

Spartak Varna
Spartak Topoli
Fan-owned football clubs
2010 establishments in Bulgaria
2011 disestablishments in Bulgaria